Freak has several meanings: a person who is physically deformed or suffers from an extraordinary disease and condition, a genetic mutation in a plant or animal, etc.

Freak, freaks or The Freak may also refer to:

Fictional characters
 Freak (Image Comics), in the Spawn comic book series
 Freak (Happy Hogan), a Marvel Comics character in Iron Man comics
 Freak (Eddie March), a Marvel Comics character in Iron Man comics
 Freak (Spider-Man villain), a Marvel Comics comic book character
 Freak (DC Comics), a member of Doom Patrol
 Joan Ferguson (Prisoner character) or The Freak a corrections guard, in the Australian soap opera Prisoner
 Joan Ferguson (Wentworth) or The Freak, a corrections guard, in the Australian television series Wentworth
 Freak, the title character of Freak the Mighty, a young adult novel by Rodman Philbrick
 Freak, a character in Saturday Night Slam Masters video game series

Stage and screen
 Freaks (1932 film), a horror film
 Freaks (2018 film), a sci-fi thriller film
 Freaks: You're One of Us, a 2020 German film distributed by Netflix
 Freak (play), a 1998 solo show by John Leguizamo
 Freak (film), a 1998 film based on the Leguizamo play
 Freak (online drama), an online teen drama for MySpace by FremantleMedia
 "Freak", an episode of Freaky

Music 
 Freaks (band), an English electronic band
 Freak Recordings, a British record label
 Bonzo Dog Freaks or Freaks, an English band featuring Vivian Stanshall

Albums
 Freaks (Pulp album) (1987)
 Freaks (Qoph album), or the title song (2012)
 Freaks (X Marks the Pedwalk album) (1992)
 Freaks, an EP by Fisher, or the title song (2020)

Songs
 "Freak" (Bruce Foxton song) (1983)
 "Freak" (Doja Cat song) (2020)
 "Freak" (Estelle song) (2010)
 "Freak" (Lana Del Rey song) (2015)
 "Freak" (Silverchair song) (1997)
 "Freak" (The Smashing Pumpkins song) (2010)
 "Freaks" (French Montana song) (2013)
 "Freaks" (Live song) (1997)
 "Freaks" (Marillion song) (1985)
 "Freaks" (Surf Curse song) (2013)
 "Freaks" (Timmy Trumpet and Savage song) (2014)
 "Le Freak", by Chic (1979)
 "Freak", by Ant Clemons (2020)
 "Freak", by Avicii from Tim (2019)
 "Freak", by Belle & Sebastian from Storytelling (2002)
 "Freak", by Days of the New from Days of the New (1997)
 "Freak", by Demi Lovato (featuring Yungblud) from Holy Fvck (2022)
 "Freak", by Klaas and Bodybangers (2010)
 "Freak", by Lexy & K-Paul (2000)
 "Freak", by Little Mix from Glory Days (2016)
 "Freak", by Rosabel (2017)
 "Freak", by Seaway from Colour Blind (2015)
 "Freak", by Swans from Filth (1983)
 "Freak", by Tyga and Megan Thee Stallion (2020)
 "Freaks", by Soul Asylum from While You Were Out (1986)
 "Freaks", by Vicious from Destination Brooklyn (1994)

People
 Charles Freak (1847–1910), British trade unionist
 Jevon Kearse (born 1976), American former National Football League player nicknamed "the Freak"
 Tim Lincecum (born 1984), American former Major League Baseball pitcher nicknamed "the Freak"
 Freak (Wally Kozielski), rock and roll radio jock in Chicago's "southland"

Other uses
 FREAK, a security exploit against web encryption
 Freaks (manga), a 2002 Japanese manga series
 Calinaga buddha or freak, a brush-footed butterfly species

See also

 Aberration (disambiguation)
 Freak folk, a genre of folk music
 Giannis Antetokounmpo (born 1994), National Basketball Association player nicknamed the "Greek Freak"
 Freak Nasty, American hip hop musician
 Freak out (disambiguation)
 Freak scene, various subcultures starting in the 1960s
 Freax or Linux, an operating system
 Freek (disambiguation)
 Freex, a 1993 Malibu Comics series
 "FreaXXX", a track from the 2009 album I'm Not a Fan, But the Kids Like It! by Brokencyde
 Freke (disambiguation)
 Freq (disambiguation)
 Phreaking, a subculture of people who study, experiment with, or explore telecommunication systems
 Phreek, a disco and post-disco musical group also known as Class Action
 Phreex, a fictional island in The Wonderful Wizard of Oz
 
 
 

Lists of people by nickname